Bati is a language of eastern Seram Island, Indonesia.

External links

Central Maluku languages
Languages of Indonesia
Seram Island